Benton High School is a school in St. Joseph, Missouri, United States. The public school teaches grades 9 through 12.

History

In 1905, the St. Joseph, Missouri Board of Education charged J. A. Bell with establishing a high school in South St. Joseph. In September of that year, Benton High School opened its doors for the first time as the BOE rented a hall at the corner of King Hill and Colorado Avenues until a new building was to be completed. 
In November, students moved into those new buildings on the corner of Cumberland and Yale Streets. The school had four rooms that held grades one through 12.

In 1929, Benton became a junior-senior high school that offered courses from the 7th through the 12th grade.

In 1938, the BOE purchased a tract of land on 4th Street, overlooking the Saint Joseph, Missouri parkway system and built a new building there on March 21, 1940. The new building contained 37 classrooms, an auditorium, gymnasium, and cafeteria and was three stories high.

In 1961, a non-pillared dome gymnasium was constructed on the north side of the school and named in honor of P.B. "Pop" Springer, longtime coach and teacher at Benton. The dome collapsed from heavy snow in 1971 and was replaced.
Many additions were made after 1969, including a two-story, twelve room wing with a spacious library and rooms for the math and social studies departments as well as an athletic field which was constructed in 1974 with an asphalt track and grandstands. Three years later the field was renamed "James Sparks Memorial Field" in honor of a Benton football player who lost his life during a game on the field earlier that season.

Benton currently enrolls between 700 and 900 students annually.

Athletics

Football
The football team won the Class 4 District 16 championship from 20042007. They have made the quarterfinals in 2005 and 2006 and the semifinals in 2004. They also have made one appearance in the Missouri state championship in 1991 after defeating Webb City 140 in a game now known as the mud bowl.

Basketball 
The girls basketball team won the Class 4 District 16 Title in 2006. The boys basketball team made it to the quarterfinals. The girls basketball team won the state championship going undefeated throughout the '06 season, compiling a 300 record. The 20152016 Lady Cardinals had a record of 310 and won the Missouri 4A state championship, and are now ranked #1 in 4A and in the state.

Baseball 

The Benton Baseball team has been successful over the past few years. From 20052007, the Benton squad, under the coaching of Mike Musser, has composed a 617 record. These teams include a 233 4th place team in 2005, a 241 2006 team who went undefeated during the regular season, however falling in the district championship game, and in 2007 a 243 state championship team. In the same stretch, Benton produced multiple division 1 baseball prospects, such as Kyle Heim (Iowa), Ryan Hook (Western Kentucky), Wes Miller (Missouri State), and Johnny Coy (Arizona State and Wichita State)

Tennis 
The Benton tennis team also experienced success from 20072009. The Benton team posted a 101 record in 2008. They became the first Benton team to win districts in over 15 years, finally losing in the quarterfinals of state to St. Pius X.

Theatre 

Benton's theatre department performs two plays each school year, one in the fall and one in the spring. In the past some plays have been And A Child Shall Lead, Dracula, Our Town, The Somewhat True Tale of Robin Hood, and Big Boys Don't Cry. In November 2010, Benton performed its first musical in eleven years, The Drowsy Chaperone. Since then the theatre has produced many musicals such as The Phantom of the Opera, Disney's The Little Mermaid, Bring It On!, Disney's Tarzan, and The Wizard of Oz. Benton has participated in Starlight Theatre's Blue Star Awards and has been nominated for several categories and won their costume nomination for their 2015 production of Glitz: The Little Miss Christmas Pageant Musical. The Theatre Department held a one-act festival each year, with the shows being directed by students and allowing both students and teachers to be involved as actors in the productions, to raise money for scholarships for students involved in theatre.

Choir 
The Benton Choir has received 1 ratings at the All State Music Festival for the last 11 years in all 3 choirs (Benton Singers, Concert Choir, and Bel Canto Women's Choir).

Notable alumni 

Wes Barnett '88 - Olympic weightlifter for the United States
Mike Rucker '94 -Former Defensive end for the Carolina Panthers
Martin Rucker '03 - Tight End for the Dallas Cowboys
Jim Wright - Pitcher for the Kansas City Royals

Statistics
Total Students: 827 
Student/Teacher Ratio: 14.34 Students : 1 Teacher
Graduation Rate - 92%
Average ACT Score - 19.4
Suspensions of Ten or More Consecutive Days: 20
Students Eligible for Free or Reduced-Price Lunch - 544 Students/66%

Enrollment by Race/Ethnicity (Number/Percent)
American Indian/Alaskan: 6 Students
Asian/Pacific Islander: 2 Students
Black: 61 Students
Hispanic: 47 Students
White: 704 Students
Two or More Races: 7 Students
Enrollment by Grade
9th Grade: 205 Students
10th Grade: 236 Students
11th Grade: 224 Students
12th Grade: 162 Students
Enrollment by Gender
Male: 437 Students
Female: 390 Students

References

Buildings and structures in St. Joseph, Missouri
Educational institutions established in 1905
Midland Empire Conference
High schools in Buchanan County, Missouri
Public high schools in Missouri
1905 establishments in Missouri